This a list of artists signed to The Inc. Records or any of its sub-labels through contracts or joint ventures, close collaborations, and being produced by an Inc. artist or producer. An asterisk (*) denotes an artist who no longer records for the label.

A
 Alexi
 Ashanti

B
 Boxie (Channel 7/The Inc.)
 Charli Baltimore
 Black Child

C
 Bettie Cage
 Caddillac Tah (Pov City/The Inc.)
 Vanessa Carlton
 Channel 7 (Channel 7/The Inc.)*
 Chris Black (Mpire/The Inc.)

D
 D. Gift
 DO Cannon

E

F
 Free

G
 Irv Gotti (CEO)
 Chris Gotti
 James Gotti

H
 Hood Stock (In Da Streetz/The Inc.)

J
 Ja Rule
 Ashley Joi (Channel 7/The Inc.)

K
 Kaisuan
 Kayoz Santana
 Jimi Kendrix

L
 Lloyd (Shonuff/The Inc.)

M
 Young Merc
 Mophi & Mofyne Records 
 Mossburg
 Murder Inc.

N
 Newz (Block Gang/Murder Inc.)
 Asia Nitollano

O
 O-1
 Harry O (Mpire/The Inc.)

R
 Ronnie Bumps
 Range

S
 Chink Santana (Byrdgang/Murder Inc.)
 Sekou 720
 Shadow
 Arizona Slim
 Slim (OneTwelve/The Inc.)
 Sponge

T
 T-Dot Raines
 The Murderers
 Thunderkatz

V
 Vita

See also
 Irv Gotti
 Ja Rule
 The Inc. Records

The Inc.